Carlos Felipe Espejo Pérez (23 August 1923 – 10 August 2014) was an Argentine swimmer who competed at the 1948 Summer Olympics in the 200 m breaststroke.

References

Swimmers at the 1948 Summer Olympics
Olympic swimmers of Argentina
Argentine male breaststroke swimmers
1923 births
2014 deaths
Sportspeople from Córdoba, Argentina